The 10th constituency of the Seine-Maritime (French: Dixième circonscription de la Seine-Maritime) is a French legislative constituency in the Seine-Maritime département. Like the other 576 French constituencies, it elects one MP using the two-round system, with a run-off if no candidate receives over 50% of the vote in the first round.

Description

The 10th Constituency of the Seine-Maritime expanded significantly as a result of the 2010 redistricting of French legislative constituencies covering a large central swathe of the department as well as a portion of its English Channel coast.

Following a similar patter to Seine-Maritime's 9th constituency the seat has swung between left and right since 1988 broadly in line with the national picture. In 2017 keeping with this pattern the constituency elected the candidate of Emmanuel Macron's En Marche! party. Again in common with the 9th constituency the victories candidate, Xavier Batut defeated a National Front opponent in the 2nd round run off.

Assembly Members

Election results

2022

 
 
 
 
 
 
 
 
|-
| colspan="8" bgcolor="#E9E9E9"|
|-

2017

 
 
 
 
 
 
 
 
|-
| colspan="8" bgcolor="#E9E9E9"|
|-

2012

 
 
 
 
 
|-
| colspan="8" bgcolor="#E9E9E9"|
|-

2007

 
 
 
 
 
 
 
|-
| colspan="8" bgcolor="#E9E9E9"|
|-

2002

 
 
 
 
 
|-
| colspan="8" bgcolor="#E9E9E9"|
|-

1997

 
 
 
 
 
 
 
|-
| colspan="8" bgcolor="#E9E9E9"|
|-

References

10